Gene Moore or Eugene Moore may refer to:

Eugene Moore (politician) (1942–2016), American politician in Illinois 
Eugene Moore (baseball), American baseball player
Gene Moore (pitcher) (1885–1938), Major League Baseball pitcher
Gene Moore (outfielder) (1909–1978), Major League Baseball outfielder
Gene Moore (basketball) (born 1945), American Basketball Association player
Gene Moore (window dresser) (1910–1998), store window dresser